Kottayi-I  is a village in Palakkad district in the state of Kerala, India. Kottayi-I and Kottayi-II come under the Kottayi gram panchayat.

Demographics
 India census, Kottayi-I had a population of 12,161 with 5,969 males and 6,192 females.

References

Villages in Palakkad district